George Loening Hickenlooper III (May 25, 1963 – October 29, 2010) was an American narrative and documentary filmmaker.

Early life
Hickenlooper was born in St. Louis, the son of Barbara Jo Wenger, a social worker and stage actress, and George Loening Hickenlooper, Jr., a teacher and playwright. He was also the grand nephew of British-born conductor Leopold Stokowski through marriage to his great aunt, pianist Olga Samaroff (whose birth name was Lucy Mary Agnes Hickenlooper).

He attended high school at St. Louis University High, where he was part of a group of teenage filmmakers he informally called the "Splicers".

After graduating from Yale University with a B.A. in History and Film Studies in 1986, Hickenlooper interned for the producer Roger Corman, and launched his directing career with Art, Acting, and the Suicide Chair: Dennis Hopper in 1988.

Career
His first feature-length documentary, Hearts of Darkness: A Filmmaker's Apocalypse, explored the making of Apocalypse Now.  It won several awards, including the National Board of Review award for "Best Documentary", an American Cinema Editors award for "Best Edited Documentary", two Academy of Television Arts and Sciences awards for "Outstanding Individual Achievement – Informational Programming – Directing" and "Outstanding Individual Achievement – Informational Programming – Picture Editing", and the International Documentary Association award. Hickenlooper himself won an Emmy for direction.

George Hickenlooper's cousin, then-Denver mayor John Hickenlooper, made a cameo appearance as a fictional senator in George's 2010 film Casino Jack. In 2020, John defeated incumbent Cory Gardner to represent Colorado in the US Senate. John also served as Governor of Colorado from 2011 to 2019.

In addition to his films, Hickenlooper authored a book in 1991, Reel Conversations.

Death
Hickenlooper died in his sleep on October 29, 2010 at the age of 47.  Despite initial reports that Hickenlooper had suffered a heart attack, the coroner ruled that his death was the result of accidental painkiller overdose, combining oxymorphone with alcohol. Sleep apnea and a "moderately enlarged heart" were contributing factors.

Filmography

Documentaries
 Art, Acting, and the Suicide Chair: Dennis Hopper, 1988
 Hearts of Darkness: A Filmmaker's Apocalypse, 1991
 Picture This: The Times of Peter Bogdanovich in Archer City, Texas, 1991
 The Big Brass Ring, 1997 (short)
 Monte Hellman: American Auteur, 1997 (short)
 Mayor of the Sunset Strip, 2003
 Speechless, 2008
 Out in the City, 2009 (short)
 'Hick' Town, 2009

Narrative films
 Ghost Brigade, 1993
 Some Folks Call It a Sling Blade, 1994 (short)
 The Low Life, 1995
 Persons Unknown, 1996
 Dogtown, 1997
 The Big Brass Ring, 1999
 The Man from Elysian Fields, 2001
 Bizarre Love Triangle, 2005
 Factory Girl, 2006
 Casino Jack, 2010

References

External links

 
 
 
Film Freak Central interview (archived)

1963 births
2010 deaths
American documentary filmmakers
Drug-related deaths in Colorado
People from St. Louis
Yale University alumni
Writers from Missouri
Film directors from Missouri
Accidental deaths in Colorado
Hickenlooper family